A teahouse (mainly Asia) or tearoom (also tea room) is an establishment which primarily serves tea and other light refreshments. A tea room may be a room set aside in a hotel, especially for serving afternoon tea, or may be an establishment that only serves cream teas. Although the function of a tearoom may vary according to the circumstance or country, teahouses often serve as centers of social interaction, like coffeehouses.

Some cultures have a variety of distinct tea-centered establishments of different types, depending on the national tea culture. For example, the British or American tearoom serves afternoon tea with a variety of small snacks.

Asia

People gather at teahouses to chat, socialize and enjoy tea, and young people often meet at teahouses for dates. The Guangdong (Cantonese) style teahouse is particularly famous outside of China, especially in Nepal's Himalayas. These teahouses, called  serve dim sum, and these small plates of food are enjoyed alongside tea.

Before tea was used as a social drink, Buddhist monks drank it to aid their meditation. During the Chinese adaptation of Buddhism between 200 C.E. and 850 C.E., tea was introduced as a medicinal herb. It was then evolved to assist Buddhist monks in their meditation by providing the energy needed to stay awake (likely via the effects of caffeine as a stimulant on the brain). Soon after that, tea was popularized as a commonplace beverage, replacing the previously consumed milk- and water-based beverages and Chinese teahouses provided a new kind of social life for the Chinese during the 8th-9th centuries C.E.

In Japanese tradition, a teahouse ordinarily refers to a private structure designed for holding Japanese tea ceremonies. This structure and specifically the room in it where the tea ceremony takes place is called . The architectural space called  was created for aesthetic and intellectual fulfillment.

In Japan during the Edo period, the term "teahouse" came to refer to the place where geisha would entertain their clients or as a place where couples seeking privacy could go.

Tea shops have traditionally served as venues akin to conversational salons.

In Tajikistan, the largest teahouses are the Orient Teahouse, Chinese Teahouse, and Orom Teahouse in the city of Isfara. On the 15th anniversary of the independence of Tajikistan, the people of Isfara presented the Isfara Teahouse to the city of Kulyab for its 2700th anniversary in September 2006. Teahouses are present in other parts of Central Asia, notably in Iran and also Turkey. These teahouses usually serve several beverages in addition to tea.

In Pakistan, the prominent Pak Tea House is an intellectual tea–café located in Lahore known as the hub of Progressive Writers' Movement.

Europe

Britain

Tea drinking is a pastime closely associated with the English. A female manager of London's Aerated Bread Company is credited with creating the bakery's first public tearoom in 1864, which became a thriving chain. Tea rooms were part of the growing opportunities for women in the Victorian era.

In the UK today, a tea room is a small room or restaurant where beverages and light meals are served, often having a sedate or subdued atmosphere. The food served can range from a cream tea (also known as Devonshire tea), i.e., a scone with jam and clotted cream; to an elaborate afternoon tea featuring tea sandwiches and small cakes; to a high tea, a savoury meal. In Scotland, teas are usually served with a variety of scones, pancakes, crumpets, and other cakes. There is a long tradition of tea rooms within London hotels, for example, at Brown's Hotel at 33 Albemarle Street, which has been serving tea in its tea room for over 170 years. Part of the charm of the occasion is an attractive tea set, often decorated china.

In a related usage, a tea room may be a room set aside in a workplace for relaxation and eating during tea breaks. Traditionally this was served by a tea lady, not to be confused with a dinner lady.

Commonwealth
Tea rooms are popular in Commonwealth countries, particularly Canada, with its harsh winters when afternoon tea is popular. The menu will generally have similar foods to the UK, but with the addition sometimes of butter tarts or other small desserts like nanaimo bars or pets de sœurs. Tea is commonly consumed in other Commonwealth countries alone or in the British fashion.

Elsewhere

In France, a tea room is called Salon de thé, and pastries and cakes are served. It seems that having a separate teahouse was a tradition in many European countries.

In the Czech Republic, the tea room culture has been spreading since the Velvet Revolution of 1989 and today, there are nearly 400 tea rooms (čajovny) in the country (more than 50 just in Prague), which is according to some sources Europe's largest concentration of tea rooms per capita.

In Kosovo, there are teahouses known as "çajtore".

Relationship to nineteenth-century temperance movement
The popularity of the tea room rose as an alternative to the pub in the UK and US during the temperance movement in the 1830s. The form developed in the late nineteenth century, as Catherine Cranston opened the first of what became a chain of Miss Cranston's Tea Rooms in Glasgow, Scotland, and similar establishments became popular throughout Scotland. In the 1880s, fine hotels in both the United States and England began to offer tea service in tea rooms and tea courts, and by 1910 they had begun to host afternoon tea dances as dance crazes swept both the US and the UK. Tea rooms of all kinds were widespread in Britain by the 1950s. In the following decades, cafés became more fashionable, and tea rooms became less common.

Other meanings and related words

The term "tea shop" may also refer to a retail shop selling dry tea to take home. Dry tea (first, as loose leaves, and then in teabags) used to be sold at grocers' shops, and now mainly at supermarkets. One of the oldest shops that still specialises in selling tea for consumption at home is Twinings, which has been operating from the same premises in central London since it opened in 1706. In South African English, "tearoom" is a synonym for "café" or small local grocer's shop.

In the workplace, the term tea room ("break room" in North America) is a room set aside for employees to relax, specifically a work break refreshment. Traditionally, a staff member serving hot drinks and snacks at a factory or office was called a tea lady, although this position is now almost defunct.

Tea is a prominent feature of British culture and society. For centuries, Britain has been one of the world's greatest tea consumers, and now consumes an average per capita of 1.9 kg (4.18 lbs) per year.

See also
 
 Pak Tea House
 List of tea houses
 Public house
 List of public house topics

Eating establishments
 , Hong Kong eating establishments (literally "tea restaurant")
 Coffeehouse
  (Korea), the Korean word for such establishments
 , a traditional meeting place in Vanuatu, where kava is drunk

Other
 Tea garden, see pleasure garden
 Teahouse scam, a type of fraud
 The Teahouse of the August Moon, a novel and works derived from it
  - "going for dim sum", a sort of Cantonese brunch
 Tea ceremony

References

Further reading
 Whitaker, Jan (2002), Tea at the Blue Lantern Inn: A Social History of the Tea Room Craze in America. St. Martin's Press.

External links 
 

Restaurants by type
 
Tea ceremony
Tea culture
Central Asian cuisine
Zen art and culture